Psychotria cernua is a species of flowering plant in the family Rubiaceae. It is endemic to Tahiti.

References 

Flora of French Polynesia
cernua
Vulnerable plants
Taxonomy articles created by Polbot
Taxobox binomials not recognized by IUCN